D2R may refer to:

 Dopamine receptor D2
 D2R Films
 Diablo II: Resurrected